Hsing Shu-yen (born 1914) was a Chinese politician. She was among the first group of women elected to the Legislative Yuan in 1948.

Biography
Originally from Dalian, Hsing graduated from the Department of Economics at National Northeastern University. She became a teacher at Lanzhou Middle School. She also served as a member of the northeast branch of the Chinese Women's Affairs Committee, director of Dalian Women's Affairs Committee and a committee member of the Northeast Women's Magazine.

Hsing was a Kuomintang candidate in Dalian in the 1948 elections for the Legislative Yuan and was elected to parliament. Her husband  was also elected as a representative of Dalian. She relocated to Taiwan during the Chinese Civil War, where she graduated from the Institute of Revolutionary Practice. She remained a member of the Legislative Yuan until 1991.

References

1914 births
Northeastern University (China) alumni
Chinese schoolteachers
Kuomintang Members of the Legislative Yuan in Taiwan
20th-century Chinese women politicians
Members of the 1st Legislative Yuan
Members of the 1st Legislative Yuan in Taiwan
Possibly living people
20th-century Chinese educators
Taiwanese people from Liaoning
20th-century Taiwanese women politicians
Chinese women educators
Chinese Civil War refugees